Socialistische Partij is Dutch for Socialist Party. It may refer to :

The Netherlands :

 Socialistische Partij (1918-1928), Dutch Socialist Party in the interbellum, dissolved in 1928
 Socialistische Partij (Netherlands), current Dutch Socialist Party in The Netherlands

Belgium :

 Socialistische Partij Anders, Socialist Party of Flanders, Belgium